Diamond Historic District may refer to:

Diamond Historic District (Lynn, Massachusetts), listed on the National Register of Historic Places in Essex County, Massachusetts
Diamond Historic District (East Liverpool, Ohio), listed on the National Register of Historic Places in Columbiana County, Ohio

See also
Diamond Match Historic District, Barberton, Ohio, listed on the National Register of Historic Places in Summit County, Ohio 
West Diamond Street Townhouse Historic District, Philadelphia, Pennsylvania, listed on the National Register of Historic Places in North Philadelphia
Diamond Hill Historic District, Lynchburg, Virginia, listed on the NRHP in Lynchburg, Virginia